Kenneth Victor Payne (born November 25, 1966) is an American college basketball coach and former player who is the head men's basketball coach at the University of Louisville. Prior to being hired at Louisville, Payne spent two seasons as an assistant coach with the New York Knicks of the National Basketball Association (NBA). A  and  small forward, Payne played college basketball at Louisville and was a member of the 1986 NCAA championship squad. He was selected by the Philadelphia 76ers with the 19th pick of the 1989 NBA draft.

Playing career
Payne played for the University of Louisville from 1986-89, winning a national title as a freshman in a victory over Duke. As a starter his last two years at Louisville, he averaged 10.7 points and 5 rebounds as junior, and 14.5 points and 5.7 rebounds as senior, while shooting 51% from the field, including 43% on 3-pointers. His last season, Louisville won the Metro Conference tournament and was rated 12th in the final poll and the team made it to the Sweet 16.

He was waived by the team in January 1993 after failing to live up to expectations. He also played professionally overseas in Italy, Japan, Brazil, the Philippines, Cyprus, China, Argentina and Australia. Following his NBA stint, Payne played one season in the Continental Basketball Association (CBA) in 1993–94, averaging 16.3 points and 6.3 rebounds per game for the Tri-City Chinook.

Coaching career
Payne served as assistant coach for the University of Oregon from 2004 to 2009. From 2010 to 2014, Payne served as assistant coach for the University of Kentucky; from 2014 to 2020, he was the associate head coach.  In 2012, Payne met with Mississippi State University's athletic director about its men's basketball team's head coach vacancy, though ultimately he was not hired.

On August 11, 2020, the New York Knicks hired Payne as assistant coach under head coach Tom Thibodeau. 

On March 18, 2022, Payne was introduced as the new head men’s basketball coach at the University of Louisville. He finished his first year as head coach with only four wins, the worst record in modern history for any Louisville basketball team.

Head coaching record

Personal life
Payne and his wife Michelle have two children. One of his children, Zan, is a player for the Louisville Cardinals men's basketball team.

References

External links

 Kentucky Wildcats profile

1966 births
Living people
American expatriate basketball people in Argentina
American expatriate basketball people in Australia
American expatriate basketball people in Brazil
American expatriate basketball people in China
American expatriate basketball people in Cyprus
American expatriate basketball people in Italy
American expatriate basketball people in Japan
American expatriate basketball people in the Philippines
American men's basketball coaches
American men's basketball players
Barangay Ginebra San Miguel players
Basketball coaches from Mississippi
Basketball players from Mississippi
Cairns Taipans players
Kentucky Wildcats men's basketball coaches
Libertad de Sunchales basketball players
Louisville Cardinals men's basketball coaches
Louisville Cardinals men's basketball players
New York Knicks assistant coaches
Oregon Ducks men's basketball coaches
Parade High School All-Americans (boys' basketball)
People from Laurel, Mississippi
Philadelphia 76ers draft picks
Philadelphia 76ers players
Philippine Basketball Association imports
Small forwards
Tri-City Chinook players